Four Doors is a concept in Sufism and in branches of Islam heavily influenced by Sufism such as Isma'ilism and Alevism. In this system, there are four paths to God, starting with Sharia, then to Tariqa, then to Marifa, and then finally to Haqiqa.

In Alevism, ten stations are listed for each of the Foor Doors. Hence, in full, the Four Doors are also known as the Four Doors and Forty Stations (Turkish: Dört Kapı Kırk Makam). These Forty Stations are listed below.

The Door of Shari'ah
1. The Door of Sharîʻah/Divine Law
 to believe
 to learn knowledge (‘ilm)
 to worship
 to earn only what sustenance is permitted (halâl) by its creator in a way that is also permissible
 abstaining from that which one's creator has forbidden (harâm)
 to perform marriages
 to marry oneself
 to abstain from sexual relation during inappropriate times
 to be a member of the community following the tradition of the Prophet Muhammad
 to be compassionate, to dress simply and to consume simple foods
 to enjoin that which is right and for abstain from that which is wrong

The Door of Tariqah
2. The Door of Tarîqah/Sufi Path
 taking the hand of a Sufi sheikh and repenting
 willfully becoming a disciple (murîd) of a Sufi sheikh
 keeping one's clothes, hair: beard both clean and in order
 struggling against the desires of one's flesh (nafs)
 serving others
 being in a state between excessive fear and hope
 taking lessons from and providing guidance to others
 distributing God's bounties to others
 reaching a state of intense love and a high level of enthusiasm
 seeing his inner essence as poor

The Door of Ma'rifah
3. The Door of Ma'rifah/Divine Knowledge
 proper morals (adab)
 fear
 abstinence
 patience and frugality
 feeling embarrassment
 generosity
 knowledge (‘ilm)
 intense poverty
 maʻrifah
 knowing oneself

The Door of Haqiqah
4. The Door of Haqîqah/Truth
 becoming earth
 not scorning the 72 nations of humanity
 being as merciful and compassionate as possible
 not seeing anyone's faults
 to be in agreement with the principles of singleness, uniqueness: oneness of God (tawhîd)
 speaking of the secrets of truth with others
 following a specific spiritual path (sayr-i sulûk)
 secret (sirr)
 beseeching God (munâjât)
 witnessing God's manifestation in creation (mushâhadah)

References 

Sufi philosophy
Islamic terminology
Alevism